Gymnastics at the 2014 Pan American Sports Festival was held at Polideportivo López Mateos  in Guadalajara, Mexico from July 17 to 27, 2014.

Medalists

Men's artistic

Women's artistic

Rhythmic gymnastics

Trampoline

Detailed results

Men's artistic

Floor Exercise

Pommel Horse

Still Rings

Vault

Parallel Bars

Horizontal Bar

Women's artistic

Vault

Uneven Bars

Balance Beam

Floor Exercise

Trampoline
Men's individual trampoline

Women's individual trampoline

References

External links
 Official site

2014
Pan American Sports Festival
Gymnastics